Raven  is a given name in the English language. While it may be given to boys and girls, it is more frequently a feminine name. In the United States of America the name has ranked among the top 1,000 names given to baby girls since 1977.

Etymology and related names
The word is the name of a bird, which is ultimately derived from the Old English hræfn. As a masculine name, Raven parallels the Old Norse Hrafn, and the Old English *Hræfn, which both mean "raven". As a feminine name Raven is among several names derived from birds such as Dove, Kestrel and Teal. Names derived from vocabulary words, such as the bird names mentioned, increased in popularity as feminine names in the English-speaking world during the 20th century. The feminine given name Ravenna is thought to be derived from the name of the northern Italian city Ravenna.  However, in some cases Ravenna may also represent a more elaborately feminine form of Raven.

Raven is also a surname in the English language. In some cases the surname is derived from the Old Norse and Old English personal names already mentioned. The surname may also originate from a nickname meaning 'raven', or a thieving person, or a dark-haired person, derived from the Middle English raven. In other cases the surname is derived from a sign name. The following surnames are examples of names from which the modern surname Raven is derived: filius Reuene, in Yorkshire, 1086; le Reven, in Worcestershire, 1327; and atte Raven, in London, 1344.  (This final surname is a sign name, which indicates that the bearer was someone who lived near a sign with a raven on it, possibly a house sign.) Raven is also a German surname derived from the Middle Low German rave, raven, meaning 'raven'. This surname originated as a nickname or from an old personal name.

Cognates
Germanic-language names of the same word-origin
*Hræfn – masculine – Old English (this name is unattested).
*Hræfning – masculine – Old English (a derivative of *Hræfn).
Hraban – masculine – a Germanic language name.
Hrafn – masculine – Old Norse.
Hraƀna – masculine – early Old Norse.
Harabana – masculine – early Old Norse.
Germanic-language names of the same meaning (and of non-Germanic origin)
Corbin – masculine – English (a name with several possible origins; in some cases it may be derived from Corbinian, see below).
Corbinian – masculine – English (possibly from Latin corvus, and Late Latin corbus, which mean "crow", "raven"). The name is possibly a translation of Germanic personal name of a similar meaning, such as Hraban.
Korbinian – masculine – German (see above Corbinian which is the English form of this name).
Non-Germanic-language names with the same meaning
Brân – masculine – Welsh (from Welsh brân, which means "raven").
Bran – masculine – Irish (from Irish bran, which means "raven").
Branán – masculine – Irish (meaning "little raven").
Branagán – masculine – Irish (a double diminutive of bran, which means "raven").
Feichín – masculine – Irish (a diminutive of Irish fiach, which means "raven").
Fiachna – masculine – Irish (from fiach, which can mean both "raven" and "hunt").

Popularity and use
In the United States of America and in Britain Raven is more commonly used as a feminine than a masculine name. The name has ranked amongst the top 1,000 feminine names recorded in Social Security card applications in the US since 1977. In 2009 it was the 636th most common feminine name. As a masculine name Raven ranked amongst the top 1,000 names only in the years 1997–2002. Its highest rank was in 1999, when it was ranked the 811th most common masculine name.

In 1990 the United States Census Bureau undertook a study of the 1990 United States Census and released a sample of data concerning the most popular names. This sample consisted of 6.3 million people and was made up of 5,494 unique first names (4,275 feminine names and 1,219 masculine names). Within this sample Raven was ranked the 1,358th most common feminine name and did not even rank amongst the 1,219 masculine names.

Popularity charts

References

English-language masculine given names
English-language feminine given names
English-language unisex given names
Given names derived from birds